Is It Always Right to Be Right? is a 1970 American short animated film directed by Lee Mishkin, produced by Stephen Bosustow Productions, and narrated by Orson Welles.

Origins
Dr. Warren H. Schmidt (who died in 2016 at the age of 95) wrote the parable that was the basis of the film and was published by the Los Angeles Times on November 9, 1969. It earned praise from both the political right (Spiro Agnew) and left (Ted Kennedy).

Plot summary
In an unnamed land thought to be the United States, two opposing sides battle to be right in their own political views.

Accolades
It won the Academy Award for Best Animated Short Film in 1970, the last to do so under its previous name "Short Subjects (Cartoons)".

References

External links

A Parable: Is It Always Right to Be Right?|HuffPost Life

1970s English-language films
1970 animated films
1970 short films
1970s animated short films
Best Animated Short Academy Award winners
Films set in the United States
Films about racism
Environmental films
1970s rediscovered films
Rediscovered American films